Chopteeth is a Washington, D.C.- based afrofunk big-band.  Although rooted in Fela Kuti's Nigerian afrobeat, Chopteeth's music is an amalgam of Ghanaian highlife, Senegalese rumba, Jamaican ska, Mande griot music, 1970's West African funk, Ewe dance drum rhythms, Kenyan Taita afropop, soul-funk, and jazz. Chopteeth's writing and arrangements feature unique driving syncopations, and occasional odd meters.  Chopteeth vocalists sing in eight different languages including English, Nigerian Pidgin, Swahili, Wolof, Mande, Twi, Taita, and French.

History 
Founded in 2004 by Robert Fox (bass), ethnomusicologist Michael Shereikis (guitar & lead vocals), Jon Hoffschneider (keyboards), and bata drummer Mark Corrales (percussion), Chopteeth quickly attracted a stable line-up of musicians including saxophonist Mark Gilbert (Gladys Knight and the Pips, The Four Tops, Cab Calloway, Don Cherry), trombonist Craig Constadine (Busta Rhymes),  trumpeter Justine Miller, Romanian guitarist Victor Crisen, Kenyan vocalist/dancer Anna Mwalagho, and Ghanaian music teacher David McDavitt (drums). In 2008 Ghanaian drummer Atta Addo joined Chopteeth on percussion.

The name "Chopteeth" comes from a song by Fela Kuti called "J'ehin J'ehin". It refers to someone who eats his own teeth, a crazy person.  Percussionist and former member Mark Corrales came up with that name for the band because he said they were insane to think they could sustain a large afrobeat band.

Chopteeth won several Wammies (Washington Area Music Awards)presented by the Washington Area Music Association (WAMA):
 2007 Best World Music Group
 2008 Best World Music Duo/Group
 2008 Best World Music Recording
 2008 Best Debut Recording
 2008 Artist of the Year
 2009 Artist of the Year
 2010 World Music Group
 2010 World Music Recording

Band
Michael Shereikis, guitar and vocals;
Robert Fox, bass;
Craig Considine, trombone;
Mark Gilbert, saxophones;
Justine Miller, trumpet and vocals;
Trevor Specht, saxophones and vocals;
Cheryl Terwilliger, trumpet;
Atta Addo, twinchin & djembe;
David McDavitt, percussion;
Brian Simms, keyboards;
Jason Walker, drums;
Victor Crisen, guitar;
Mark Corrales, percussion (former);

Educational Sites Authored by Chopteeth
The Afrofunk Forum Blog  News, music reviews and commentary on Afrobeat and related music from Africa, The Caribbean and The Americas.
 Fela Kuti Lyrics transcribed by Chopteeth's David McDavitt
A List of Afrobeat Bands Active Worldwide

Video
Kennedy Center Millennium Stage Three Chopteeth concerts at the Kennedy Center in Washington D.C.

Discography

Albums
Struggle, 2008
Chopteeth Live, 2010

Recording Collaborations
Sierra Leone's Refugee All Stars
Cheick Hamala Diabate (Malian griot, ngoni master, Grammy nominee)

References
Washington Post Article on Afrobeat in America: Chopteeth & Antibalas
Chopteeth's Homepage
Kennedy Center
Chopteeth Member Bios
 Chopteeth Biography

External links
Chopteeth Interview at NPR Music

Footnotes

See also
Afrobeat
Fela Kuti
Afrofunk
Tony Allen
Cheick Hamala Diabate

Musical groups from Washington, D.C.
Afro-beat musical groups
American world music groups
Musical groups established in 2004